André Regaud (14 February 1868 – 12 January 1945) was a French shooter who competed at the 1908 Summer Olympics, the 1912 Summer Olympics and the 1920 Summer Olympics.

He was born in Lyon and died in Paris.

In 1908 he won a bronze medal with the French team in the small-bore rifle event. He also finished fourth with the French team in the team pistol competition and tenth in the individual pistol event.

In the 1912 Summer Olympics he participated in the following events:

 Team small-bore rifle - fourth place
 50 metre pistol - 15th place
 50 metre rifle, prone - 41st place

And in the 1920 Summer Olympics he participated in the following events:

 Team military pistol - fifth place
 Team free pistol - sixth place

References

External links
profile 

1868 births
1945 deaths
French male sport shooters
ISSF pistol shooters
Olympic shooters of France
Shooters at the 1908 Summer Olympics
Shooters at the 1912 Summer Olympics
Shooters at the 1920 Summer Olympics
Olympic bronze medalists for France
Olympic medalists in shooting
Medalists at the 1908 Summer Olympics
20th-century French people